Thorp is a city in Clark County in the U.S. state of Wisconsin. The population was 1,621 at the 2010 census. The city is located partially within the Town of Thorp and partially within the Town of Withee.

Geography
Thorp is located at  (44.959792, -90.801061).

Name
Thorp was named after Joseph G. Thorp, who founded the Eau Claire Lumber Company in 1866 and was a state senator in the 1860s and 1870s.

Demographics

2010 census
As of the census of 2010, there were 1,621 people, 712 households, and 393 families living in the city. The racial makeup of the city was 98.9% White, 0.6% Native American, 0.1% from other races, and 0.5% from two or more races. Hispanic or Latino of any race were 0.9% of the population.

There were 712 households, of which 27.7% had children under the age of 18 living with them, 39.7% were married couples living together, 10.5% had a female householder with no husband present, 4.9% had a male householder with no wife present, and 44.8% were non-families. 39.6% of all households were made up of individuals, and 21.2% had someone living alone who was 65 years of age or older. The average household size was 2.19 and the average family size was 2.91.

The median age in the city was 41.5 years. 24.4% of residents were under the age of 18; 6.2% were between the ages of 18 and 24; 22.3% were from 25 to 44; 23.9% were from 45 to 64; and 23.2% were 65 years of age or older. The gender makeup of the city was 46.9% male and 53.1% female.

2000 census
As of the census of 2000, there were 1,536 people, 706 households, and 391 families living in the city. The population density was 1,158.9 people per square mile (445.9/km2). There were 759 housing units at an average density of 572.7 per square mile (220.3/km2). The racial makeup of the city was 99.41% White, 0.07% Black or African American, 0.07% Native American, 0.13% Asian, 0.07% from other races, and 0.26% from two or more races. 0.59% of the population were Hispanic or Latino of any race.

There were 706 households, out of which 25.6% had children under the age of 18 living with them, 42.5% were married couples living together, 9.1% had a female householder with no husband present, and 44.5% were non-families. 39.9% of all households were made up of individuals, and 24.6% had someone living alone who was 65 years of age or older. The average household size was 2.10 and the average family size was 2.82.

In the city, the population was spread out, with 23.0% under the age of 18, 7.4% from 18 to 24, 23.5% from 25 to 44, 18.3% from 45 to 64, and 27.8% who were 65 years of age or older. The median age was 42 years. For every 100 females, there were 81.8 males. For every 100 females age 18 and over, there were 79.1 males.

The median income for a household in the city was $29,102, and the median income for a family was $39,000. Males had a median income of $30,602 versus $20,163 for females. The per capita income for the city was $15,828. About 6.7% of families and 11.0% of the population were below the poverty line, including 11.0% of those under age 18 and 19.2% of those age 65 or over.

Education
Students living within Thorp, Wisconsin, attend schools within the School District of Thorp. There are two main schools in Thorp. They are the Thorp Catholic School and the Thorp Public School. The Catholic school has grades ranging from 1–8 grade and then they will go to the Thorp High School. The Thorp Public School contains PreK–6 elementary school, 7–8 junior high, and 9–12 high school.

Notable people

 Filet of Soul – a rock band from the 1960s
 Corwin C. Guell – Wisconsin politician
 Jeff Hazuga – NFL player
 Stanley J. Lato – Wisconsin politician
 Mike Maslowski – former starting linebacker for the Kansas City Chiefs
 Billy Simons - former professional golfer
 Andy North – former professional golfer
 Eugene Oberle – Wisconsin farmer and politician
 Arnt O. Rhea – Wisconsin farmer, politician, and educator
 Joseph Schmittfranz – Wisconsin politician
 John Verkuilen – Wisconsin farmer and politician
 Robert K. Zukowski – Wisconsin politician

References

External links

 Thorp, Wisconsin website
 Sanborn fire insurance maps: 1894 1900 1916

Cities in Wisconsin
Cities in Clark County, Wisconsin